John Bolton (1756–1837) was a Liverpool-based merchant in the West Indies and South America and a successful slaver. He also contributed to the defence of Great Britain during the Napoleonic Wars, giving 500l to the national defence and raising and commanding a battalion of Liverpool volunteers as lieutenant-colonel.

Life 
John Bolton, third and final son of the apothecary Abraham Bolton (died 1764) by his wife, Ann, née Philipson, was born in King Street, Ulverston, Lancashire, on 22 March 1756. The surname was probably originally spelt Boulton.

John was educated at the local grammar school, and apprenticed at Liverpool to the firm of Rawlinsons & Chorley, merchants in the West Indies cotton trade, who sent him to the Caribbean, where he was employed by them, on St. Vincent and later St. Lucia, between 1773 and 1783. He returned to Liverpool a wealthy man in 1784, and undertook a lucrative trade with the Windward Islands in sugar, cotton, coffee, rum, and molasses. In 1787 he branched into the African trade, investing in seventy-three slaving voyages between 1787 and 1807, often as the sole investor, in the last years of the British slave trade. These voyages carried perhaps 20,000 slaves to the New World.

In February 1798, during the Napoleonic Wars, Bolton gave 500l. for the defence of his country. In 1803 he raised and funded a force of 800 volunteers, the first battalion of the Liverpool Volunteers, which he led as lieutenant-colonel till 1806. In the same year he bought Storrs Hall and 1000 acres on Lake Windermere, and there received such notable personages as Christopher North, William Wordsworth, Sir Walter Scott, Canning, and Huskisson. 

Bolton also owned property in Demerara, Guiana, St. Vincent, and St. Croix. Following the abolition of slavery by the British Parliament in 1833, Bolton, and later his estate, were compensated to the amount of 35,240l. 13s. 7d. for the cost of emancipating 783 slaves working land in which Bolton was invested.

Bolton died in Liverpool on 24 February 1837, in his eighty-first year, and was interred in St Martin's Church, Bowness-on-Windermere on 9 March. Against the wall of the south aisle of the church is a white veined marble slab dedicated to Bolton.

Personal life 

Bolton married Elizabeth Littledale (born 1768), daughter the merchant Henry Littledale, and sister of Bolton's future business partner Anthony Littledale, at St. Marylebone Church, London, on 31 May 1797. The marriage was barren. Elizabeth died a widow on 22 September 1848.

See also 

 Liverpool slave trade

References

Sources 

 Hyde, Matthew; Pevsner, Nikolaus (2010) [1967], Cumbria: Cumberland, Westmorland and Furness. New Haven and London: Yale University Press, pp. 165–167. ISBN 978-0-300-12663-1.
 Mathews, Godfrey W. (1941). "John Bolton, A Liverpool Merchant, 1756–1837". The Historic Society of Lancashire and Cheshire, 93. pp. 98–115.

Further reading 

 Jones, Clement (1959). John Bolton of Storrs, 1756–1837. Kendal: Titus Wilson & Son, Ltd. pp. 1–62.
 "Colonel John Bolton". National Museum of Liverpool. National Museums Liverpool. Retrieved 6 October 2022.
 "John Bolton". Legacies of British Slavery. University College London (UCL). Retrieved 6 October 2022.

1756 births
1837 deaths
British Army officers
English slave traders
English merchants